Sargat culture, was a sedentary archaeological culture that existed between 7th century BC and 5th century AD in Western Siberia. Sargat cultural horizon encompassed northern forest steppe zone between the Tobol and Irtysh rivers, which is currently located in Russia and Kazakhstan.  The northernmost Sargat culture presence is found near Tobolsk, on the border of the forest zone. In the south, the area of culture coincides with the southern border of the forest-steppe. Eastern foothills of the Urals make up the western boundary of the culture, meanwhile Baraba forest-steppe forms the eastern edge for Sargat settlements and burial grounds. The culture is named after the village of Sargatskoye, which is located near a Sargat burial ground.

Archeological and genetic evidence suggest that Sargat culture was a potential zone of intermixture between native Ugrian and/or Siberian populations and steppe peoples from the south, possibly of early Iranian or Indo-Iranian stock. However, if the Iranians gave the language, it does not explain the origin of the Magyar language.

Society

Metallurgy 

Sargat metallurgy shows a domestic character. The remains of simple blast furnaces and forges have been discovered in some settlements associated with the culture. The increasing production of Sargat iron supplied the local population and its nomadic neighbors. Metallographic examination of Sargat material shows that objects made of malleable iron and steel of average and high quality were prevalent. Unevenly carbonized steel was produced directly in the blast furnace. On average, carbonized steel resulted from a special process of cementation was used for weapon production. Forging, multilayered welding, and tempering was known as well, though quality of welding was not high and the temperature regime was rather unstable.

Genetics 
mt-DNA samples isolated from individuals associated with Sargat culture showed that A, C, T1, Z, B4a, N1a1a1a, U5a1, H, H8, and C4a2c1 haplogroups were present among the population. N1a1, R1a1, Q1 and R1b are the Y-chromosomal haplogroups that were isolated from Sargat remains.

According to a 2021 study that examined genome-wide data of various ancient Central Asian steppe peoples the northern sedentary Sargat-related cultures show a close genetic proximity with the eastern nomadic Scythians. The examined Sargat individuals also show additional affinity not found in the Scythian groups ultimately related to a northern Siberian lineage. The results affirms the historical hypothesis that Sargat culture formed as a result of admixture between incoming Scythian groups and an unknown local or neighboring population that possibly carried this extra Siberian ancestry.

See also 

 Ingala Valley

References 

Archaeological cultures in Russia
Archaeological cultures in Kazakhstan
Iron Age cultures of Europe
Iron Age cultures of Asia